Arıqdam (also, Arıxdam, Arygdam, and Arykhdam) is a village and municipality in the Gadabay Rayon of Azerbaijan.  It has a population of 2,200.

References 

Populated places in Gadabay District